María Teresa Torró Flor was the defending champion, but chose not to participate.

Iga Świątek won the title, defeating Kimberley Zimmermann in the final, 6–2, 6–2.

Seeds

Draw

Finals

Top half

Bottom half

References
Main Draw

Montreux Ladies Open - Singles
Lugano
Montreux Ladies Open